Electroputere S.A. (which translates as Electropower in English) is a Romanian company based in Craiova. Founded in 1949, it is one of the largest industrial companies in Romania. Electroputere has produced more than 2,400 diesel locomotives, and 1,050 electric locomotives for the Romanian, Bulgarian, Chinese, and Polish railways, additionally producing other urban vehicles and complex equipment.

Products
Electroputere are currently manufactures of:
 Industrial electrical parts – circuit breakers, transformers etc.
 Industrial electric motors & Converters
 Heavy duty power transformers
 Railway and Urban vehicles.

They also have divisions specialising in:
 Forging and molding metal
 Equipment repairing
 Tools modernisation.

Electric and diesel-electric locomotives

Export orders
A total of 1,105 locomotives were delivered between 1972 and 1991 to railway companies in the following countries:
 Bulgaria
 China
 Greece
 Iran
 Poland
 United Kingdom
 Yugoslavia

One of its more notable foreign orders was for the Class 56 locomotives for British Rail. The 30 locomotives were outsourced to Electroputere because Brush Traction could not build them at its own plant; however, upon their arrival in the UK, the machines were deemed to be unsuitable for use, as they suffered from poor construction standards, and had to be withdrawn and extensively rebuilt. (However, they were seen as being perfectly reasonable for use in Romania by the Romanian crews who tested them).

In 1955–1959, Electroputere produced the V54 tram, which was delivered to the cities of Bucharest, Timișoara and Oradea. Unmodified examples ran up to 1989, whilst the largest number of examples ran in Bucharest, serving as the backbone of the city's network in the 1960s (they were later modernized in 1976–1982, and ran up to June 2000). Aside from this, Electroputere modernized multiple V3A trams between 1997 and 2002, with the first three of them receiving Holec (Holland Electric) equipment. Between 1994 and 1996, Electroputere and FAUR modernized multiple Astra IVA sets for operation on the M2 line of the Bucharest Metro, the project eventually failed and the blue IVA sets never entered service.

The most important railway locomotives, as classed by the Romanian railway factory nomenclature were the LDE 2100, LE 5100 and LDE 3000/4000, which were mainly delivered to the Romanian Railways, and a few foreign customers. Apart from the latter, which were withdrawn in the mid-1990s and early-2000s due to their uneconomical nature and increased fuel consumption, the LDE 2100 and LE 5100 form the backbone of the Romanian Railways network.

Photo Gallery

See also
 Romanian Railways – Căile Ferate Române
 FC Electroputere Craiova - a football club with a similar name

References

External links

Electroputere official site (in English)
CFR 2,100hp Co-Co Locomotive

 
1949 establishments in Romania
Manufacturing companies established in 1949
Locomotive manufacturers of Romania
Companies based in Craiova
Privatized companies in Romania
Companies listed on the Bucharest Stock Exchange
Romanian brands